Hindmarsh is a surname. Notable people with the surname include:

 Alfred Hindmarsh, MP for  Wellington South (New Zealand electorate)  and first leader of the  New Zealand Labour Party 
 Ian Hindmarsh, Australian rugby league player
 Jim Hindmarsh, Australian dual-code rugby player
 Jean Hindmarsh, singer and actress
John Hindmarsh (disambiguation), articles about people with the name, John Hindmarsh 
 Johnny Hindmarsh, 1930s racing-car driver and test pilot
 Mary MacLean Hindmarsh, Australian botanist
 Mike Hindmarsh, Major General in the Australian Defence Force
Nathan Hindmarsh, Australian rugby league player
 Robert Hindmarsh, first minister and chief organiser of the New Church (Swedenborgian)

See also
Shire of Hindmarsh, in Australia
Hindmarch